Barkatullah or Barakatullah is a male Muslim given name and surname composed of the elements Barakat and Allah, meaning blessings of God. it may refer to

People
Mohamed Barakatullah Bhopali (1854–1927), anti-British Indian revolutionary
Mohammad Barkatullah (author) (1898–1974), Bangladeshi author
Barkatullah Khan (1920–1973), Indian politician
Barkatullah (archdeacon) (1891–1960), Christian apologist
Mohammad Barkatullah (producer) (1940s–2020), Bangladeshi television producer
Bijori Barkatullah, Bangladeshi actress

Others
Barkatullah University, Indian university named after a freedom fighter

Arabic masculine given names